Isaiah 12 is the twelfth chapter of the Book of Isaiah in the Hebrew Bible or the Old Testament of the Christian Bible. This book contains the prophecies attributed to the prophet Isaiah, and is one of the Books of the Prophets. The Cambridge Bible for Schools and Colleges describes this chapter as "the lyrical epilogue to the first great division of the book (chapters 1–12)".

Text 
The original text was written in Hebrew language. This chapter is divided into 6 verses and consists of two short hymns of praise. Protestant theologian Heinrich Ewald argued in 1840 that these songs contain little of the distinctive language used elsewhere by Isaiah, and were probably a later addition to the book; by the end of the nineteenth century his opinion had "slowly won a wide acceptance among scholars".

Textual witnesses
Some early manuscripts containing the text of this chapter in Hebrew are of the Masoretic Text tradition, which includes the Codex Cairensis (895), the Petersburg Codex of the Prophets (916), Aleppo Codex (10th century), Codex Leningradensis (1008).

Fragments containing parts of this chapter were found among the Dead Sea Scrolls (3rd century BC or later):
 1QIsaa: complete
 1QIsab: extant: verses 3‑4, 6
 4QIsaa (4Q55): extant: verses 4‑6
 4QIsab (4Q56): extant: verses 2
 4QIsac (4Q57): extant: verses 1
 4QIsal (4Q65): extant: verses 1‑4, 6

There is also a translation into Koine Greek known as the Septuagint, made in the last few centuries BCE. Extant ancient manuscripts of the Septuagint version include Codex Vaticanus (B; B; 4th century), Codex Sinaiticus (S; BHK: S; 4th century), Codex Alexandrinus (A; A; 5th century) and Codex Marchalianus (Q; Q; 6th century).

Parashot
The parashah sections listed here are based on the Aleppo Codex. Isaiah 12 is a part of the Prophecies about Judah and Israel (Isaiah 1–12). {P}: open parashah; {S}: closed parashah.
 [{P} 11:11-16] 12:1-6 {S}

Verse 2
 Behold, God is my salvation,
 I will trust and not be afraid;
 ‘For Yah, the Lord, is my strength and song;
 He also has become my salvation.’''

Hebrew (Masoretic text)
 הנה אל ישועתי אבטח ולא אפחד כי־עזי וזמרת יה יהוה ויהי־לי לישועה׃
Transliteration:
 hi·neh EL ye·shu·'a·ti eb·takh we·lo eph·khad 
ki-a·zi we·zim·rat YAH YHWH way·hi-li li·shu·'ah.

 "Yah, the Lord" (יה יהוה, Y(a)H Y(e)H(o)W(a)H) the repetition of God's holy name emphasizes that the salvation of Israel does not come from other nations but only from God, who always keeps His covenant with the people of Israel.

See also

Crossing the Red Sea
Hallel
Song of the sea
YHWH
Zion

Related Bible parts: Exodus 15, Psalm 34, Psalm 118, Psalm 145

References

Bibliography

External links

Jewish
Isaiah 12 Hebrew with Parallel English

Christian
Isaiah 12 English Translation with Parallel Latin Vulgate

12